Xia Dalong (born 17 June 1993) is a Chinese-Japanese footballer who plays as a attacker for Sichuan Jiuniu.

Career

Xia started his career with Chinese fourth division side Shenzhen Xinqiao, in an attempt in helping them gaining promotion to the China League Two.

Before the 2019 season, he signed for Baoding Yingli ETS in the Chinese third division.

In 2020, Xia signed for Chinese second division club Sichuan Jiuniu.

Career statistics

References

External links
 

Japanese footballers
Japanese expatriates in China
Chinese footballers
Japanese sportspeople of Chinese descent
Expatriate footballers in China
Association football forwards
Living people
China League One players
1993 births
Sichuan Jiuniu F.C. players